John Wesley (1703–1791) was an Anglican cleric and theologian, the founder of Methodism.

John Wesley may also refer to:

 John Wesley (artist) (1928–2022), American modern painter
 John Wesley (guitarist) (born 1962), American rock singer and guitarist
 John Wesley (actor) (1947–2019), American actor
 John Wesley (film), a 1954 British film

See also
 John Westley (1636–1678), 17-century nonconformist minister (grandfather of John Wesley)
 John Westley (actor) (1878–1948), American stage actor
 

Wesley, John